Jacksonville is a town in Telfair County, Georgia, United States. The population was 140 at the 2010 census.

History
Jacksonville was the original county seat of Telfair County. Land lot 340 in land district 8 was declared to be the permanent county seat in 1814. On November 25, 1815, the Georgia General Assembly declared that the new county seat be named Jacksonville after the hero of the recent Battle of New Orleans, Andrew Jackson. At the time it was located in the center of the county, but when Coffee County was created from the part of Telfair County below the Ocmulgee River in 1854, the town became near the southwestern boundary of the county. In 1856, a referendum was called for the change of the county seat. The results are unknown, but the county seat remained at Jacksonville until after the American Civil War.

In 1871, the seat was transferred from Jacksonville to McRae, which had been established as a station on the Macon and Brunswick Railroad a year before.

The world record largemouth bass was caught near Jacksonville on June 2, 1932 by George Perry.

Geography

Jacksonville is located at  (31.813397, -82.975191).

Demographics

As of the census of 2000, there were 118 people, 49 households, and 32 families residing in the town. The racial makeup of the town was 62.71% White and 37.29% African American.

There were 49 households, out of which 22.4% had children under the age of 18 living with them, 42.9% were married couples living together, 16.3% had a female householder with no husband present, and 32.7% were non-families. 32.7% of all households were made up of individuals, and 20.4% had someone living alone who was 65 years of age or older. The average household size was 2.41 and the average family size was 2.97.

In the town, the population was spread out, with 22.9% under the age of 18, 5.9% from 18 to 24, 22.9% from 25 to 44, 32.2% from 45 to 64, and 16.1% who were 65 years of age or older. The median age was 44 years. For every 100 females, there were 84.4 males. For every 100 females age 18 and over, there were 85.7 males.

The median income for a household in the town was $17,045, and the median income for a family was $20,000. Males had a median income of $21,250 versus $17,188 for females. The per capita income for the town was $9,829. There were 37.5% of families and 34.8% of the population living below the poverty line, including 43.6% of under eighteens and 30.0% of those over 64.

See also
 List of county seats in Georgia (U.S. state)

References

Towns in Telfair County, Georgia
Towns in Georgia (U.S. state)
Former county seats in Georgia (U.S. state)